Allium rothii is a plant species found in Israel, Palestine, Syria, Egypt, and Jordan. It is a perennial with umbel-shaped flowers that forms bulbs. Stamens and ovaries are noticeably deep purple, and the tepals are white with deep purple midveins..

References

rothii
Onions
Flora of Israel
Flora of Palestine (region)
Flora of Syria
Flora of Egypt
Flora of Jordan
Plants described in 1843